Thelma Van Alstyne  (born 1913 as Thelma Selina Scribbans) was a Canadian artist who was elected to the Royal Canadian Academy of Arts in 1977.

Life and career 
Van Alstyne was born in Victoria, British Columbia. Although she studied at the Vancouver School of Art, she is mostly self-taught. She worked as a secretary before becoming an artist. After moving to Toronto, Ontario she became more active in the arts scene. She created abstract art among other types, often using watercolour and pastel, or oil paint as her mediums.

Beyond art, van Alsytne was deeply spiritual (embracing both Buddhism and Christianity), and practised and taught Tai chi.

Van Alstyne died in Port Hope, Ontario on August 24, 2008.

Work 
Van Alstyne's work is held by the Art Museum at the University of Toronto.

Since her death, several of van Alstyne's works have been sold at auctions.

Queen's University Archives has a folder of text materials archived, and the Toronto Public Library has two images of van Alystne from the 1960s in their digital archive.

Major exhibitions 
 Pollock Gallery, Toronto, Ontario
 Art Gallery of Northumberland, Coburg, Ontario

Awards and nominations 
In 1977, Alystne was elected a member of the Royal Canadian Academy of Arts.

Alstyne was listed in both the International Who's Who and the Canadian Who's Who (1981–83).

References 

1913 births
2008 deaths
Artists from Victoria, British Columbia
Canadian women painters
Members of the Royal Canadian Academy of Arts